The Rio Pueblo de Taos, also known as Rio Pueblo, is a stream in Taos County, New Mexico, United States, that a tributary of the Rio Grande. On the way the river passes by Taos and through Taos Pueblo.

Course

Several headwater tributaries drain the south and east slopes of Old Mike Peak, Lew Wallace Peak, and Red Dome. It is joined by La Junta Creek from the south, then Buffalo Grass Creek from the north. Within a mile the river passes through the center of Taos Pueblo, then turns to flow southwest to the Rio Grande, passing just north of the town of Taos. The river's entire upper course in the mountains is within the Pueblo de Taos Indian Reservation.

Near Taos the Rio Lucero joins the Rio Pueblo de Taos from the north, after which the river flows by the historic Martinez Hacienda. Shortly below that the Rio Fernando de Taos joins from the south, after which the Rio Pueblo de Taos enters Taos Canyon. It is joined by Rio Grande del Rancho, which flows from the south through Ranchos de Taos, Arroyo Seco, from the north, then Arroyo del Alamo, from the south, after which it reaches the Rio Grande in the Rio Grande Gorge a few miles south of the Rio Grande Gorge Bridge. New Mexico State Road 567 crosses the Rio Grande via the Taos Junction Bridge just below its confluence with the Rio Pueblo de Taos. The area is part of the Orilla Verde Recreation Area.

Names
In addition to Rio Pueblo de Taos and Rio Pueblo, the stream has been known by various other names, including Rio Taos, Taos Creek, Pueblo Creek, Ialap'aijpaana, Ja'lapa, Kipawai, T'awi'impo, and T'awipo.

See also

 List of rivers of New Mexico
 List of tributaries of the Rio Grande

References

External links

 Rio Pueblo de Taos, New Mexico Whitewater

Tributaries of the Rio Grande
Rivers of New Mexico
Rivers of Taos County, New Mexico
Taos Pueblo